John M. True (1838–1921) was a member of the Wisconsin State Assembly and the Wisconsin State Senate.

Biography
True was born in Moultonborough, New Hampshire, in 1838. In 1866, he settled in Greenfield, Sauk County, Wisconsin. He died on February 17, 1921, in Galesburg, Illinois, and was buried in Baraboo, Wisconsin, on February 19, 1921.

Career
True was a member of the Assembly during the 1897 and 1899 sessions. From 1911 to 1915, he represented the 27th District in the Senate. Other positions True held include member of the Board of Education (similar to school board) and Assessor of Baraboo and Chairman of the Board of Supervisors and Register of Deeds of Sauk County, Wisconsin. He was a Republican.

References

People from Moultonborough, New Hampshire
People from Baraboo, Wisconsin
Republican Party Wisconsin state senators
Republican Party members of the Wisconsin State Assembly
County supervisors in Wisconsin
School board members in Wisconsin
1838 births
1921 deaths
Burials in Wisconsin